Lonnie Ballentine (born April 23, 1993) is a former American football safety. He was drafted by the Houston Texans with the final pick (256th overall) of the 2014 NFL Draft, making him Mr. Irrelevant for 2014. He played college football at Memphis.

High school career
Ballentine graduated from Southwind High School early as a junior. As a junior, he had 45 tackles, 6 interceptions and 12 pass breakups. He only played 1 year of varsity football. He also played basketball and ran track in high school.

College career
In his freshman year in 2010, Ballentine had 13 tackles and 2 pass breakups while starting 1 game. His sophomore season he had 28 tackles and 1 pass breakup while starting several games and having 2 tackles for loss. His Junior season he had 3 interceptions and 66 total tackles to go with 5 pass breakups. He also was an All C-USA Honorable Mention that year as well. His Senior season, he was a preseason 4th team All C-USA selection and finished the year with 58 tackles and 5 pass breakups during the year while starting all 12 games.

Professional career
Ballentine did not attend the NFL Combine but was drafted with the final pick, 256th overall, of the 2014 NFL Draft. He signed a 4-year, $2.27 million contract with the Texans. 

On August 30, 2016, Ballentine was placed on reserve/PUP to start the 2016 season. He was activated to the active roster on October 22, 2016. On November 12, Ballentine was placed on injured reserve.

On September 2, 2017, Ballentine was waived/injured by the Texans and placed on injured reserve. He was released on September 8, 2017.

References

External links
Memphis Tigers bio

1993 births
Living people
Players of American football from Memphis, Tennessee
American football safeties
Memphis Tigers football players
Houston Texans players